Ismail Al-Sabiani (born 25 April 1989 in Jeddah) is a Saudi Arabian track and field athlete who specialises in the 400 metres.

He began competing internationally at sixteen years old, running in the heats of the 800 metres at the 2005 World Youth Championships in Athletics. His first major senior tournament came the following year in the form of the 2006 Asian Games. Although he was eliminated in the heats of the 400 m, he won the gold medal in the 4×400 m relay with the Saudi team including Hamdan Odha Al-Bishi, Hamed Hamadan Al-Bishi and Mohammed Al-Salhi. Al-Sabiani secured a second relay gold at the 2007 Asian Athletics Championships and was the youngest athlete in the 400 m final, finishing in seventh. He was selected for the 2007 Pan Arab Games later in the year and broke 47 seconds for the first time with a personal best run of 46.99 sec in the heats. He also won another gold with the Saudi relay team.

Al-Sabiani started the next year at the 2008 Asian Indoor Athletics Championships and helped the relay team to victory in a Championship record time of 3:14.25. At the 2008 Asian Junior Athletics Championships in Jakarta he set a new best of 46.33 sec to take the 400 m gold and also won the relay bronze medal. Following this, he competed on the global stage at the 2008 World Junior Championships in Athletics and reached the semi-finals of the 400 m.

The 2009 season saw him progress into the senior ranks. He took victory at the 2009 Asian Indoor Games in November with a national indoor record run of 47.31 sec. He set a second national indoor record the following day, as he helped the Saudi team to the relay gold in a time of 3:10.31 (also a Games record). He won his first outdoor senior medal in the 400 m later that month, finishing behind Liu Xiaosheng and Yuzo Kanemaru to take the bronze medal at the 2009 Asian Athletics Championships. The following year, he started off the Saudi relay team to a gold medal win in national record time (3:02.30 min) at the 2010 Asian Games.

References

External links

1989 births
Living people
Saudi Arabian male sprinters
Sportspeople from Jeddah
Asian Games medalists in athletics (track and field)
Athletes (track and field) at the 2006 Asian Games
Athletes (track and field) at the 2010 Asian Games
Athletes (track and field) at the 2014 Asian Games
Asian Games gold medalists for Saudi Arabia
Asian Games bronze medalists for Saudi Arabia
Medalists at the 2006 Asian Games
Medalists at the 2010 Asian Games
Medalists at the 2014 Asian Games
20th-century Saudi Arabian people
21st-century Saudi Arabian people